Emmanuel Saint-Hilaire (born 5 December 1952) is a Haitian middle-distance runner. He competed in the men's 1500 metres at the 1976 Summer Olympics.

References

1952 births
Living people
Athletes (track and field) at the 1975 Pan American Games
Athletes (track and field) at the 1976 Summer Olympics
Haitian male middle-distance runners
Olympic athletes of Haiti
Place of birth missing (living people)
Pan American Games competitors for Haiti